Steve Frank (born May 2, 1948 in St. Louis, Missouri) was a U.S. soccer midfielder who spent six seasons in the North American Soccer League.  He also earned one cap with the U.S. national team.  He is currently the Executive Vice President and Director of Plancorp, a financial planning and advisory firm.

Soccer

High school and college
Frank attended Bishop DuBourg High School, graduating in 1966.  He then attended St. Louis University (SLU) where he played on the men’s soccer team from 1966 to 1969.  During his four seasons with the team, the Billikens won the NCAA Men's Soccer Championship in 1967 and 1969.  He was a second team All-American in 1968 and graduated with a bachelor’s degree in commerce in 1970.  He went on to earn a J.D. degree from Saint Louis University School of Law in 1973.

NASL
Frank signed with his hometown St. Louis Stars, of the North American Soccer League in 1970.  He played six seasons before retiring from playing professionally following the 1975 season. In 1971 as a member of the Stars, he took part in the league's first ever indoor tournament, scoring no goals and earning two penalty minutes.

National team
Frank earned one cap with the U.S. national team in a 4–0 loss to Bermuda on March 17, 1973.

Post soccer career
In 1988, Frank became a partner at Peper, Maring Jensen, Maichel & Hetledge, a legal firm in St. Louis.  He then served as vice president, Assistant General Counsel at McDonnell Douglas, an aircraft manufacturing company, from 1994 through 1997.  He then held executive positions with Boeing after it acquired McDonnell Douglas in 1997.  In 1999, he became the Executive Vice President and Director for Plancorp, a financial planning and advisory firm.  He is also the Chairman of the Board for Bishop DuBourg High School and sits on the St. Louis University Board of Regents.   He was inducted into the St. Louis University Athletic Hall of Fame in 1995 and the St. Louis Soccer Hall of Fame in 2001.

External links
 NASL stats
 Plancorp bio

References

1948 births
Living people
American soccer players
United States men's international soccer players
Saint Louis University alumni
Saint Louis Billikens men's soccer players
North American Soccer League (1968–1984) players
North American Soccer League (1968–1984) indoor players
St. Louis Stars (soccer) players
American lawyers
American money managers
Boeing people
Soccer players from St. Louis
Association football midfielders